South Korea, as Korea, competed at the 1972 Summer Olympics in Munich, West Germany. 42 competitors (32 men and 10 women), took part in 24 events in 8 sports.

Medalists

Archery

In the first modern archery competition at the Olympics, South Korea entered three women. Their highest placing competitor was Kim Ho-gu, at 7th place in the women's competition.

Women's Individual Competition:
 Kim Ho-gu - 2369 points (7th place)
 Ju Chun-sam - 2349 points (12th place)
 Kim Hyang-min - 2275 points (20th place)

Athletics

Men's High Jump
 Park Sang-soo
 Qualification Round — 2.00m (→ did not advance)

Men's 4 × 100 m Relay
 Lee Chung-ping, Soo Wen-ho, Chen Chin-lung, and Chen Ming-chih
 Heat — 41.78s (→ did not advance)

Women's Shot Put
 Paik Ok-ja
 Qualification Round — 15.78m (→ did not advance)

Women's Discus Throw
 Paik Ok-ja
 Qualification Round — DNS (→ did not advance)

Boxing

Men's Light Middleweight (–71 kg)
 Jae Keun-lim
 First Round — Bye
 Second Round — Defeated Namchal Tsendaiush (MGL), 3:2
 Third Round — Lost to Rolando Garbey (CUB), TKO-2

Judo

Shooting

Five male shooters represented South Korea in 1972.
Open

Swimming

Men's 400 m freestyle:
 Cho Oh-ryun - Heat: 4:21.78 (did not advance)

Men's 1500 m freestyle
 Cho Oh-ryun - Heat: 17:29.23 (did not advance)

Volleyball

Men's: 7th place
 Roster: Choi Jong-ok, Chung Dong-kee, Jin Jun-tak, Kang Man-soo, Kim Chung-han, Kim Kun-bong, Kim Kyui-hwan, Lee Chun-pio, Lee In, Lee Sun-koo, Lee Yong-kwan, and Park Kee-won
 Preliminary round: 2-3
 Semi–Final: Lost to Romania (0-3)
 Final: Defeated Brazil (3-0)

Women's: 4th place
 Roster: Jo Hea-jung, Kim Eun-hui, Kim Young-ja, Lee In-sook, Lee Jung-ja, Lee Kyung-ai, Lee Kyung-sook, Lee Soon-bok, Yoon Young-nae, Yu Jung-hye, and Yu Kyung-hwa
 Preliminary round: 2-1
 Semi–Final: Lost to Japan (0-3)
 Final: Lost to D.P.R. Korea (0-3)

Weightlifting

Lightweight:
 Won Shin-hee - 427.5 kg (7th place)

Wrestling

References

Korea, South
1972
1972 in South Korean sport